Divine Shepherd is: 

a designation for Jesus Christ as the Good Shepherd of humanity
a designation for Psalm 23 which contains the metaphor